The Bass Anglers Sportsman Society (B.A.S.S.) is a fishing membership organization with more than a half a million members. It is geared toward bass fishermen, mainly in the United States but with members located worldwide. The society publishes Bassmaster magazine and other related publications, and also produces The Bassmasters weekly television program. B.A.S.S. is best known for the sport fishing tournament trails it sponsors, and for the championship event of its primary series, the Bassmaster Classic. The society's logo is a blue shield with a leaping largemouth bass and the society's acronym, as seen in the image on the right.

History
In 1967, Ray Scott of Montgomery, Alabama launched the concept of competitive bass fishing by forming the Bass Anglers Sportsman Society. In late 2010, Alabama businessmen Don Logan and Jim Copeland plus veteran broadcaster Jerry McKinnis formed an ownership group to purchase the organization from ESPN. In 2011, the new owners relocated B.A.S.S. headquarters from Celebration, Florida, to Birmingham, Alabama. In 2017 Anderson Media Corp., a 100-year-old family business founded in Ala., acquired a majority interest in B.A.S.S.

The B.A.S.S. organization advances the sport through advocacy, outreach and an expansive tournament structure while connecting directly with the passionate community of bass anglers through its media vehicles. B.A.S.S. is a tournament and membership organization serving more than 515,000 members and their families.

All-time record book
Most B.A.S.S. tournaments won:

 25, Kevin VanDam
 19, Roland Martin
 17, Denny Brauer
 16, Rick Clunn
 14, Larry Nixon

At the 2020 Toyota Bassmaster Texas Fest benefiting Texas Parks & Wildlife Department, winner and Bassmaster Elite Series angler Patrick Walters set a Bassmaster record for margin of victory by finishing 29 pounds, 10 ounces ahead of the second-place finisher.

Angler of the Year Award

The Angler of the Year (AOY) award is given to the angler who, at the end of the season, has accumulated the most points throughout the year's "Elite Series" tournaments. Winners of the award:
 
 1970 — Bill Dance
 1971 — Roland Martin
 1972 — Roland Martin
 1973 — Roland Martin
 1974 — Bill Dance
 1975 — Roland Martin
 1976 — Jimmy Houston
 1977 — Bill Dance
 1978 — Roland Martin
 1979 — Roland Martin
 1980 — Larry Nixon
 1981 — Roland Martin
 1982 — Larry Nixon
 1983 — Hank Parker
 1984 — Roland Martin
 1985 — Roland Martin
 1986 — Jimmy Houston
 1987 — Denny Brauer
 1988 — Rick Clunn
 1989 — Gary Klein
 1990 — Guido Hibdon
 1991 — Guido Hibdon
 1992 — Kevin VanDam
 1993 — Gary Klein
 1994 — David Fritts
 1995 — Mark Davis
 1996 — Kevin VanDam
 1997 — Davy Hite
 1998 — Mark Davis
 1999 — Kevin VanDam
 2000 — Tim Horton
 2001 — Mark Davis
 2002 — Davy Hite
 2003 — Jay Yelas
 2004 — Gerald Swindle
 2005 — Aaron Martens
 2006 — Michael Iaconelli
 2007 — Skeet Reese
 2008 — Kevin VanDam
 2009 — Kevin VanDam
 2010 — Kevin VanDam
 2011 — Kevin VanDam
 2012 — Brent Chapman
 2013 — Aaron Martens
 2014 — Greg Hackney
 2015 — Aaron Martens
 2016 — Gerald Swindle
 2017 — Brandon Palaniuk
 2018 — Justin Lucas
 2019 — Scott Canterbury
 2020 — Clark Wendlandt
 2021 — Seth Feider
 2022 — Brandon Palaniuk

Tournaments

The first ever B.A.S.S. Federation tournament was held in June 1967 on Beaver Lake, Arkansas. A total of 106 anglers from thirteen different states competed. In that All-American Bass Tournament, Scott charged a $100 entry fee with a chance to win $2,000 and a trip to Acapulco, Mexico. The winner of this first tournament was Stan Sloan.

Scott staged the first Bassmaster Classic in 1971 at Lake Mead, Nevada — though competitors didn't know the location until they were in an aircraft bound for Las Vegas. The "mystery lake" practice continued through 1976; the following year Scott announced the venue in advance so that fans could make plans to attend the event. Since then, the final weigh-in events, and fishing expositions held together with those events, have become huge spectator events filling large arenas and being broadcast live on ESPN.

In 2021, all nine Bassmaster Elite events and the Bassmaster Classic were covered live on Fox Sports platforms and Fox Sports 1.

B.A.S.S Federations sponsor several tournaments and series:

Bassmaster Classic

The Bassmaster Classic is considered the "Super Bowl of Fishing". This world championship event is held once every year and has become a fan favorite. This tournament has a first place prize of $300,000 USD.

Bassmaster Elite Series

This series has a total of eight regular season events and two AOY fish offs with a total of $11 million to give away in prizes. This makes up bass fishing's most lucrative competitive league. This series schedule runs from coast to coast through all phases of the seasons of bass fishing.

Bassmaster Opens

This series sets a platform for amateur anglers to emerge as aspiring pros. Both boaters and non-boaters compete in the Bassmaster Opens, which provides advancement to the Bassmaster Elite Series.  Also, an automatic entry to the next years Bassmaster Classic is awarded to the winner of each Bassmaster Open event however in addition they must fish all three Open events in their division to qualify.

Bassmaster College Series 
The Bassmaster College Series gives college anglers a platform where they can compete with their peers and get a taste of what it feels like to compete on a national level. The series pits teams of college anglers against one another for cash, prizes, bragging rights and the ultimate prize in fishing: a chance to compete in the Bassmaster Classic.

Women's Bassmaster Tour

This tour opened October 20, 2005 at Lake Lewisville in Dallas Texas and was presented by Triton and Legend Boats. The winner of each WBT took home a boat valued at $50,000. Australian born Kim Bain-Moore was the WBT's 2008 Angler of the Year as well as the end of season Championship winner. The tour was closed after the 2009 season won by Pam Martin Wells.

B.A.S.S. Nation

Formerly the B.A.S.S. Federation Nation, the name was changed to B.A.S.S. Nation at the beginning of the 2013 season. B.A.S.S. Nation is composed of bass tournament clubs throughout the country. They provide the opportunity for anglers to compete in bass tournaments at a local level as well as different state and national tournaments culminating in the opportunity to fish the Bassmaster Classic.

References

External links
Official website

Recreational fishing organizations
Organizations based in Birmingham, Alabama
Former subsidiaries of The Walt Disney Company